This is a list of the teams which played the 1968 Rugby League World Cup.

Australia
Coach: Harry Bath

Lionel Williamson
Graeme Langlands
Johnny Greaves
Johnny Rhodes
Bob Fulton
Billy Smith
John Wittenberg
Fred Jones
Arthur Beetson
Dick Thornett
Ron Coote
Johnny Raper
Elton Rasmussen (c)

France
Coach: Jep Lacoste

Jean-Claude Cros, fullback for Albi
Daniel Pellerin, wing for Villeneuve
Jacques Gruppi, centre for Villeneuve
Michel Molinier, centre for Albi
Jean-Pierre Lecompte, wing for Saint-Gaudens
Jean-René Ledru, centre for Avignon
Jean Capdouze, five-eight for Catalan
Roger Garrigue, halfback for Saint-Gaudens
Marius Frattini, halfback for Cavaillon
Christian Sabatié, prop for Villeneuve
Yves Bégou, hooker for Toulouse
Georges Ailleres (c), lock for Toulouse
Francis de Nadaï, second row for Limoux
Hervé Mazard, second row for Lézignan
Henri Marracq, prop for Saint-Gaudens
Adolphe Alésina, lock for Carcassonne
Jean-Pierre Clar, lock for Villeneuve
Victor Serrano, prop for Saint-Gaudens

In the initial list, Bernard Quatrevault (Bordeaux) was included. However, due to an injury, he renounces and was replaced by Jean-René Ledru, who was a substitute in the touring list alongside Jean-Claude Lauga (Villeneuve) and Pierre Garaig (Marseille).

Great Britain
Coaches: Bill Fallowfield and Colin Hutton:

 Kevin Ashcroft
 John Atkinson
 Tommy Bishop
 Ian Brooke
 Alan Burwell
 Mick Clark
 Derek Edwards
 Peter Flanagan
 Ray French
 Bob Haigh
 Roger Millward
 Arnold Morgan
 Charlie Renilson
 Bev Risman (c)
 Mick Shoebottom
 Clive Sullivan
 John Warlow
 Cliff Watson
 Chris Young

New Zealand
Coach: Des Barchard

Jim Bond (c)
Eric Carson
Gary Clarke
Oscar Danielson
Kevin Dixon
Spencer Dunn
Doug Ellwood
Tony Kriletich
Brian Lee
Colin McMaster
Robert Mincham
Colin O'Neil
Paul Schultz
Ray Sinel
Garry Smith
Roger Tait
Henry Tatana
Ernie Wiggs
Des Barchard

External links
World Cup 1968 at Rugby League Project

1968 in rugby league
Rugby League World Cup squads